Liversidge or Liversedge is an uncommon surname of English origin. It probably derives from Liversedge, a village in West Yorkshire. Notable people with the surname include:

Archibald Liversidge (1847–1927), Australian chemist
Robert Liversidge (1904–1994), British Jewish businessman
Joan Liversidge (1914–1984), British archaeologist
Richard Liversidge (1926–2003), South African  naturalist
Pamela Liversidge (born 1949), English mechanical engineer
Reuben Liversidge,  Australian actor

References

See also
Liversidge v Anderson, a 1942 English court-case